Tea thoracica is a species of spider-hunting wasp belonging to the family Pompilidae.

This species can be found in Spain and Italy.

References

Insects described in 1794
Pompilidae
Hymenoptera of Europe
Taxa named by Pietro Rossi